Dudgah is a village in Badakhshan Province in north-eastern Afghanistan, about 20 miles east of Keshem.

References

Populated places in Tishkan District